Khaneqah-e Vosta (also Romanized as Khāneqāh-e Vostá and Khānqāh-e Vosţá; also known as Khāneqāh, Khāneqāh-e Vasaţ, Khānqāh, and Khānqāh-e Vasaţ) is a village in Kivanat Rural District, Kolyai District, Sonqor County, Kermanshah Province, Iran. At the 2006 census, its population was 138, in 33 families.

References 

Populated places in Sonqor County